Forest Lawn Memorial Park is a nonsectarian cemetery located in Boardman Township, Mahoning County, Ohio, United States. It was built in the 1930s and added to the National Register in 2018.

Notable burials at Forest Lawn include MLB infielder Floyd Baker (1916–2004) and actress Elizabeth Hartman (1943–1987).

References

External links
 
 
 

Cemeteries on the National Register of Historic Places in Ohio
National Register of Historic Places in Mahoning County, Ohio